Mecyclothorax lissus is a species of ground beetle in the subfamily Psydrinae. It was described by Castelnau in 1867.

References

lissus
Beetles described in 1867